Shooter is a 2016 Bangladeshi action-drama film. The film directed by Raju Chowdhury and produced by Mohammad Iqbal under the banner of Sunan Movies. The film story written by Delwar Hossain Dil and screenplay and dialogue by Abdullah Zahir Babu. The film stars Shakib Khan and Shabnom Bubly in lead roles and Samraat, Shahriaz, Misha Sawdagor, Manoshi Sarkar and Tithi Kabir also played supporting roles in films. The film was released on September 13, 2016.

Cast 
 Shakib Khan as Surja / Shooter Surjo
 Shabnom Bubly as Labanya
 Samraat as Rumel
 Misha Sawdagor as Shark
 Manoshi Sarkar
 Alvin Jannat Jahid
 Chikon Ali as Burger Ali
 Jinat Kabir Tithi
 Shahriaz
 Saniya Zaman Zara
 Nana Shah
 Rebeka Rouf
 Habib Khan
 Nipa Ahmed Realy

Soundtrack 

The soundtrack album of the film is composed by Javed Ahmed Kislu and lyrics by Sudip Kumar Dip.

Release 
The film was released in 152 theatres on September 13, 2016, on the occasion of Eid al-Fitr.

References

External links 
 

2016 films
Bengali-language Bangladeshi films
Bangladeshi action drama films
2016 action drama films
2010s Bengali-language films